Hide is a surname. Notable people with the surname include:

Arthur Hide, English first-class cricketer 
Edward Hide, British jockey
Herbie Hide, British boxer
Jesse Hide, English cricketer
Molly Hide, English cricketer
Peter Hide (born 1944), English sculptor
Raymond Hide (1929–2016), British physicist
Rodney Hide (born 1956), New Zealand politician
Sam Hide historic or apocryphal character 
Sandeep Hide, professional football player 
Yuki Hide Japanese singer

See also
Jack Hides (1906–1938), Australian explorer
Charlie Hides (born 1964), American drag queen
Hyde (surname)